This article details Trailer Nos. 61 – 62 of the Manx Electric Railway on the Isle of Man.

These were the final trailers supplied to the tramway, apart from the replacement cars of 1930, these trailers are both in regular use, with No. 62 most usually paired with Car No. 32.

References

Sources
 Manx Manx Electric Railway Fleetlist (2002) Manx Electric Railway Society
 Island Island Images: Manx Electric Railway Pages (2003) Jon Wornham
 Official Official Tourist Department Page (2009) Isle Of Man Heritage Railways

Manx Electric Railway